Ger Robinson (born 9 June 1982 in Dunboyne) is an Irish football striker, who last played for Kildare County in the League of Ireland. He is also involved in Gaelic football and has managed the Meath under-20 county team.

Biography
Robinson was signed by Middlesbrough as an apprentice at age 14 and trained alongside the likes of Fabrizio Ravanelli, Juninho and Paul Gascoigne as a youngster with Middlesbrough. Despite showing promise, he was never promoted to the senior team, and after ITV digital went bankrupt he returned to Ireland on loan at Dundalk F.C.

He scored on his League of Ireland debut at home to Shels on 27 August 2001 and at the end of the season he picked up an FAI Cup winner's medal.  He then had spells with Kilkenny City, Monaghan United and Longford Town before changing codes to play GAA. For Longford he scored one goal in 7 total appearances

He picked up a Meath Senior Football Championship winner's medal for St Peters Dunboyne in the following years, where he was man of the match in the final .

Robinson returned to soccer when his uncle John Ryan gave him a chance to line out for Kildare County while maintaining his GAA commitments at the same time. In the 2006 seasons and the 2007 seasons he played for Kildare County only in the latter end of the season due to GAA commitments. In this spell he scored 10 goals in 15 games.  In 2008, he committed solely to soccer and played the entire season but only scored 1 goal in 31 appearances.  He did not play for The Thoroughbreds after that.

Following his retirement, he became manager of St Peters Dunboyne. He managed the Meath under-20 football team from 2019 until 2020. On 10 December 2020, it was announced that he would become manager of Clogherinkoe.

Honours

Soccer
 FAI Cup
 Dundalk: 2002
 AFL Div 3 North
    Dunboyne o35s - 2022

GAA
Meath Senior Football Championship: 1
 St Peters Dunboyne - 2005

References

1982 births
Living people
Association footballers from County Meath
Association football forwards

Republic of Ireland association footballers
Republic of Ireland youth international footballers
Expatriate footballers in England
Scarborough F.C. players
League of Ireland players
Dundalk F.C. players
Kilkenny City A.F.C. players
Monaghan United F.C. players
Longford Town F.C. players
Kildare County F.C. players
St Peter's Dunboyne Gaelic footballers
Gaelic footballers who switched code
Gaelic football managers